The buhay (also known as a bugai, buhai, berebenytsia, bika, buga, bochka) is a musical instrument that is used in Ukraine and is classified as a friction drum. Buhay is the Ukrainian word for great bittern (Botaurus stellaris), and its use as name of the instrument refers to the sound produced. The mating call or contact call of the male Buhay (Botaurus stellaris) is a deep, sighing fog-horn or bull-like boom with a quick rise and an only slightly longer fall, easily audible from a distance of 3 mi (4.8 km) on a calm night.

Hornbostel-Sachs classification number 232.11-92

The buhay consists of a conical barrel (sometimes a wooden bucket). At one end a sheep membrane is stretched with a hole in this skin's center. Through this hole a tuft of horse hair with a knot at one end is passed. Usually two performers are needed to operate the instrument, one to hold the instrument, the other to pull the horsehair with moistened fingers. In recent times versions of the buhay have been made which are held in position by the players feet allowing one player to play the instrument. These instruments can be played successfully by one player without assistance. Five to six different sounds can be obtained from the instrument, depending on the skill of the player.

The buhay plays an important part in New Years and Christmas rituals.

It is used in works by the Ukrainian folk instruments orchestra.

The buhay and local variants is common to Ukraine, Romania (called buhai), Moldova, Hungary, Lithuania, and Poland (with various regional names: burczybas, "grumbling bass", brzãczadło, brzãczëdło, brzãczk, mrëczk, bąk, bùk, brantop, brumtop, brumbas ).

The buhay has been used as a leading instrument in the title track on the album "Vidlik" by the Ukrainian electronic experimental music band ONUKA. It is also used as a leading instrument in the "Boogaj Boogie" song by Ukrainian neofolk rock ethnofussion gospel band "Voanerges".

See also
 Cuíca
 Ukrainian folk music

References
 Samples and Pictures of Ukrainian Instruments
Humeniuk, A. - Ukrainski narodni muzychni instrumenty - Kyiv: Naukova dumka, 1967
Mizynec, V. - Ukrainian Folk Instruments - Melbourne: Bayda books, 1984
Cherkaskyi, L. - Ukrainski narodni muzychni instrumenty - Tekhnika, Kyiv, Ukraine, 2003 - 262 pages. 

Ukrainian musical instruments
Romanian musical instruments
Friction drums

pl:Burczybas